Roy Harper may refer to:

Roy Harper (character), DC Comics character
Roy Harper (footballer) (born 1929), Australian footballer
Roy Harper (referee) (died 1969), English football referee
Roy Harper (singer) (born 1941), English musician
Roy Winfield Harper (1905–1994), American judge

See also
"Hats Off to (Roy) Harper", a song about the English musician by Led Zeppelin on the 1970 album Led Zeppelin III